Terrestrial high-definition television is a form of broadcast high-definition television that is received via the terrestrial airwaves using either a VHF television aerial or a UHF television aerial. Depending on the country, the high definition television channels are broadcasts using either ATSC, ISDB-T, DVB-T or DVB-T2.

Countries that have terrestrial high-definition television

America
  using ATSC
  using ATSC
  using ISDB-T

Europe
  using DVB-T2 under the name Freeview HD
  using DVB-T MPEG-4 under the name Saorview
  using DVB-T MPEG-4 under the name Télévision Numérique Terrestre
  using DVB-T MPEG-4
  using DVB-T2
  using DVB-T2
  using DVB-T MPEG-4
  using DVB-T2 under the name Europa 7 HD
  using DVB-T MPEG-4
  using DVB-T MPEG-4
  using DVB-T2 under the name simpliTV
  using DVB-T2 under the name evotv
  using DVB-T MPEG-4
  using DVB-T MPEG-4 under the name Towercom

Africa
  using DVB-T MPEG-4

Asia
  using ISDB-T
  using ATSC
  using DVB-T MPEG-4 under the name IDAN Plus

Oceania
  using DVB-T MPEG-2 under the name Freeview
  using DVB-T MPEG-4 under the name Freeview

Countries without terrestrial high-definition television
Some countries such as Germany, The Netherlands and Belgium may only broadcasts their channels in standard definition via the terrestrial airwaves. This is largely because the uptake of cable television may be higher than that of terrestrial television, thus giving broadcasters very little incentive to provide their high-definition services via the terrestrial airwaves.

References

High-definition television